Bulcher is a small, unincorporated community in far northwestern Cooke County, Texas, United States, approximately  south of the Oklahoma border.

History
Bulcher was founded in the spring of 1872 when John A. Davis moved his family into the area. The threat of Indian raids had dwindled and the vicinity offered a voluminous amount of cheap, fertile farm land laid out just south of the Red River. It didn't take long for others to follow the lead of the Davises. The population shot up to 250 by the end of a decade and a school house was established along with a handful of other businesses. Postmaster Matthew A. Morris founded the post office in 1874 and settler William H. Cox built a cotton gin in 1875. The census remained on a slight downward slide from 1887 into the 1900s due to the bypass of the railway 10 miles south of town until the village enjoyed a small oil boom in the summer of 1926. The community was briefly rejuvenated by the discovery but the well had run dry by the early 1930s and only 40 residents resided in Bulcher in the year 1933. The population remained roughly unchanged for the next fifty years until the last of the town's citizens began to migrate in the late 1980s, leaving the site with 0 permanent residents for much of the 1990s and early 2000s. Today, just 6 people remain.

Today, it is a popular area for self-guided foliage tours, as well as home to a 2500-acre (10 km) off-road motorcycle park popular with riders from all over the United States. The park is host to the annual Last Man Standing rough-terrain motorcycle race. Almost all of the vacated buildings have been completely destroyed due to vandalism and just a broken down church remains along with the old abandoned Valley Creek school house hidden in the woodlands two miles east of town.

Unincorporated communities in Texas
Unincorporated communities in Cooke County, Texas